Qeshlaq-e Padar may refer to:
Qeshlaq-e Padar Eys Khan
Qeshlaq-e Padar Hajji Bahrish
Qeshlaq-e Padarjamal